The Pet Shop was an American television program broadcast on the DuMont Television Network. The series ran from 1951 to 1953, and was a primetime series on pet care hosted by Gail Compton and his young daughter Gay.

The program, produced and distributed by DuMont, aired on Saturdays at 7:30 pm ET on most DuMont affiliates. The series was cancelled in 1953. DuMont replaced the series with local (non-network) programming.

See also
List of programs broadcast by the DuMont Television Network
List of surviving DuMont Television Network broadcasts
1952-53 United States network television schedule

References

Bibliography
David Weinstein, The Forgotten Network: DuMont and the Birth of American Television (Philadelphia: Temple University Press, 2004) 
Alex McNeil, Total Television, Fourth edition (New York: Penguin Books, 1980) 
Tim Brooks and Earle Marsh, The Complete Directory to Prime Time Network TV Shows, Third edition (New York: Ballantine Books, 1964)

External links
 DuMont historical website

DuMont Television Network original programming
1951 American television series debuts
1953 American television series endings
Black-and-white American television shows
Television series about animals